Satlyki (Hatlıq) is a rural locality (a village) in Yuldybayevsky Selsoviet, Kugarchinsky District, Bashkortostan, Russia. The population was 238 as of 2010. There are 2 streets.

Geography 
Satlyki is located 19 km southeast of Mrakovo (the district's administrative centre) by road. Muradym is the nearest rural locality.

References 

Rural localities in Kugarchinsky District